Gregorio Pio Punzalan Catapang Jr., CCLH (born 11 July 1959) is a retired Filipino general who served as the 45th Chief of Staff of the Armed Forces of the Philippines. He was the Vice Chief of Staff prior to his appointment as head of the armed forces. He was also the former head of the AFP Northern Luzon Command and 7th Infantry Division. He is part of the Philippine Military Academy Dimalupig Class of 1981. He was part of the Reform the Armed Forces Movement. On October 21, 2022 upon the suspension of BUCOR Director General Usec. Gerald Bantag, Catapang was appointed by President Bongbong Marcos as the Officer in Charge of the Bureau of Corrections.

Early life and education
Gregorio "Greg" Pio P. Catapang Jr. was born on July 11, 1959 in Manila. He is the second of four children of Gregorio Catapang Sr., a lawyer for the Securities and Exchange Commission, and Lourdes Punzalan, a CPA for the Department of Finance. He was named after two generals Gregorio del Pilar and Pio del Pilar. Early on in life his parents taught him the value of public service.

He attended Claret School of Quezon City highschool where he was voted as the high school class president. He entered the Philippine Military Academy in 1977 and graduated in 1981. Shortly after graduating from PMA he pursued graduate courses in the University of the Philippines and became a member of Upsilon Sigma Phi.

Military career
He moved on with his career carrying an excellent standard of performance, fine leadership, and a keen vision that resulted in accomplishments, both in garrison and field tours of duty. He held positions of major responsibility, such as: Commander of the 7th Infantry (Kaugnay) Division, Philippine Army, Commander, 703 Infantry Brigade,  of the 7ID, PA (now 10ID, PA) from September 6, 2010 to October 3, 2012; Battalion Commander of 28IB, 4ID, PA (now 10ID, PA) from November 20, 1999 to March 3, 2001; Battalion Commander of HHSBn, 4ID, PA from March 3 to December 17, 2001; Ac of S for Operations, G3, 8ID, PA from July 16, 2002 to February 1, 2003; ACUCS for CMO, U7, NOLCOM, AFP from February 19 to May 12, 2003; ACUCS for Operations, U3, NOLCOM, AFP from May 12, 2003 to October 24, 2005; and Chief of Unified Command Staff, NOLCOM, AFP from May 15 to October 24, 2005.

His professional military training include: Intel Officers Basic Course at the SITS, ISAFP in 1982; Infantry Officers Advance Course at Combat Arms School, TCPA in 1992; Command and General Staff Course at the Training and Doctrine Command at Fort Bonifacio in 2002; Australian and Military Familiarization Course and ADC Preparation Course at the Defence International Training Center in Australia, in 2005; Defence and Strategic Studies Course at the Australian Defence College in 2006; Symposium on National Security and Strategy at NDU, PLA, China in 2007; and Change Management Workshop and Strategic Communications at the Australian Defense Coop Program in 2008.

Communist insurgency
Catapang was instrumental in the normalization of Northern and Central Luzon. As an Army captain he helped transform Porac from a hotbed of communist insurgency to peaceful municipality. As a General by the time he left as NOLCOM Command he was able to declare Central Luzon as peaceful and ready for further development

Climate change
Catapang was recognized for significantly contributing to the relief operations in the aftermath of Tropical Storm Ondoy in 2009. At the time, he was assigned to the Office of Civil Defense.

Chief of Staff
In his talk to men, Catapang urged the troops to strictly adhere to the AFP's slogan of “Kawal DISIPLINADO, bawal ABUSADO, dapat ASINTADO”. These three key words are acronyms that spell out the dos and don'ts to be followed by every AFP personnel for them “to become proficient in fire and maneuver and be able to avoid collateral damage; be respectful of human rights, adhere to international humanitarian law and rule of law, as well as the rules of engagement of the IPSP Bayanihan.” 

Catapang vowed to continue modernization of the Armed Forces of the Philippines, from being the hub of "flying coffin helicopters" and an "Itali Yan" navy, to the home of a strong and well-equipped Philippine Air Force and Philippine Navy.

Catapang promised to enhance the anti-insurgency campaign, dubbed the Internal Peace and Security Plan (IPSP), especially against the Communist Party of the Philippines-New People's Army-National Democratic Front (CPP–NPA–NDF).

In 2014, Catapang advised 40 Filipino soldiers serving as peacekeepers for the United Nations Disengagement Observer Force who were surrounded by Syrian Islamist rebels in the Golan Heights to defy an order from the commander of the UN forces to lay down their arms and surrender. The Filipino soldiers instead engaged the rebels and managed to escape.

He is the Chief of Staff during the failed rescue of 44 Special Action Force Commandos who died in Mamasapano, Maguindanao.

Military service awards
  Philippine Republic Presidential Unit Citation
  Martial Law Unit Citation
  People Power I Unit Citation
  People Power II Unit Citation
    Philippine Legion of Honor- Degree of Chief Commander and Officer
   Distinguished Service Star
  Distinguished Conduct Star
   Gold Cross (Philippines)
  Outstanding Achievement Medal
   Gawad sa Kaunlaran
  Distinguished Aviation Cross
  Bronze Cross Medals
  Military Merit 
   Military Commendation Medal
  Military Civic Action Medal 
   Silver Wing Medal
  Parangal sa Kapanalig ng Sandatahang Lakas ng Pilipinas
   Gawad sa Kaunlaran
Gawad sa Kapayapaan
  Bintang Yudha Dharma Utama
  Long Service Medal
   Sagisag ng Ulirang Kawal
  Anti-Dissidence Campaign Medal
  Luzon Anti Dissidence Campaign Medal
  Visayas Anti-Dissidence Campaign Medal
  Mindanao Anti-dissidence Campaign Medal
  Disaster Relief and Rehabilitation Operations Ribbon
  Combat Commander's Badge (Philippines)
 Scout Ranger Badge

Personal life
Catapang's nationalism further shows in his children's names:

Rally ("rally")- born in 1984
Rev ("revolution") - born in 1986; see People Power Revolution
Coup'dy ("coup d'état") - born in 1987; see Coup attempts against Cory Aquino
Ysa (pagkakaisa, Tagalog for "unity") - born in 1993.
Best General ("20th century"")

References

Filipino generals
Living people
People from Manila
Chairmen of the Joint Chiefs (Philippines)
1959 births
Benigno Aquino III administration personnel
Philippine Military Academy alumni
University of the Philippines alumni
Recipients of the Philippine Republic Presidential Unit Citation
Recipients of the Philippine Legion of Honor
Recipients of the Distinguished Service Star
Recipients of the Distinguished Conduct Star
Recipients of the Gold Cross (Philippines)
Recipients of the Outstanding Achievement Medal
Recipients of the Bronze Cross Medal
Recipients of the Military Merit Medal (Philippines)
Recipients of the Military Commendation Medal
Recipients of the Military Civic Action Medal
Recipients of the Silver Wing Medal